The South China AA volleyball team is a department of the South China Athletic Association (SCAA). The department also has another men's volleyball team known as Nam Ching as well as women's volleyball team also known as "South China".

History
South China's men team finished as the runner-up of 2017 President Cup, losing to defending champions Dragon Team. The team also signed two Thai internationals for the competition.

Notable players

  Henry Chan

Controversies
In 2010, it was accused that the derby between South China and its sister team Nam Ching was match-fixed.

References

External links
 Fact sheet from South China AA official website 
 

Volleyball
Hong Kong volleyball clubs